The Shipunov 2A42 is a Soviet/Russian 30 mm autocannon. It is built by the Tulamashzavod Joint Stock Company and named after .

Design
The 30 mm 2A42 autocannon was developed as a replacement for 2A28 Grom and has a dual feed. One is for HE-T and the other for AP-T rounds. The gunner can select one of two rates of full automatic fire, low at 200 to 300 rds/min and high at 550 to 800 rds/min. According to the manufacturer, effective range when engaging ground targets such as light armoured vehicles is 1,500 m while soft-skinned targets can be engaged out to 4,000 m. Air targets can be engaged flying at low altitudes of up to 3,000 m at subsonic speeds and up to a slant range of 2,500 m. In addition to being installed in a two-person turret on the BMP-2 mechanised infantry combat vehicle, this gun is also fitted in the BMD-2 airborne combat vehicle, BMD-3 airborne combat vehicle and BTR-90 (or GAZ-5923) (8 × 8) armoured personnel carrier. A small number of these have now entered service. More recently, the 30 mm 2A42 cannon has been installed in a new turret and fitted onto the roof of the BTR-T heavy armoured personnel carrier based on a modified T-54/T-55 MBT chassis. The cannon is also the main armament of BMPT (Tank Support Fighting Vehicle). It is also used for various armament projects from various manufacturers. The design bureau for the 30 mm 2A42 cannon is the KBP Instrument Design Bureau.

The 2A42 autocannon has also been used on the BMPT and Bumerang-BM, and on unmanned remote controlled weapon station turrets on the new Russian infantry fighting vehicles, Kurganets-25, VPK-7829 Bumerang. and T-15 Armata.

Variants
 2A42 – standard version.
 2A72 – lighter simplified variant with a lower number of parts, a longer barrel, and higher muzzle velocity, but also a lower rate of fire. It is long recoil-operated, not gas-operated.
 ABM-M30M3 – remote Weapon Station made by Impulse-2, for Uran-9 or different armored vehicles.
 ABM-M30M3 Vikhr – another remote weapon station made by Impulse-2.
 TRT-30 – remote weapon station.
 ZPT-99 – In the 1990s, the People's Republic of China imported BMP-3 weapon systems technology, and then they re-introduced the cannon. The Chinese production model of 2A72 was named ZPT-99.  It was widely used by Chinese armored fighting vehicles.

Ammunition
The 2A42 fires 30×165 ammunition, a cartridge introduced in the 1970s in the Soviet Union to replace previous 30 mm autocannon cartridges. Other weapons using this size of cartridge case include the 2A38, 2A38M, and 2A72 autocannons for various vehicle, helicopter and air defence applications, as well as numerous single-, dual- and six-barrel naval and air force cannons. The 2A42, 2A38, 2A38M, and 2A72 fire percussion-primed ammunition; the naval and aerial cannons use electrical priming, and therefore their ammunition is not interchangeable with the land-based ammunition types, despite the same cartridge case size.

Originally three basic types of ammunition were developed in the Soviet Union for the land-based weapons: high-explosive incendiary, high-explosive fragmentation with tracer, and an armour-piercing ballistic capped with tracer. Later a sub-caliber armour-piercing round was introduced, and today also countries other than Soviet Union/Russia manufacture 30 x 165 percussion-primed ammunition. The main types of ammunition are summarized in the table below:

Airburst munitions for Russian 30mm and 57mm autocannons are in development.

Platforms

The autocannon has been used since the 1980s on the following platforms:

Infantry fighting vehicles
 2T Stalker
 MT-LBM 6MB
 BMP-1AM (2A72)
 BMP-2
 BMP-3 (2A72)
 BMD-2
 BMD-3
 BMD-4 (2A72)
 BTR-80A (2A72)
 BTR-82A (2A72)
 BTR-87
 BTR-90
 BTR-T
 BMPT
 Fahd 280-30
 Boragh
 T-15 Armata
 VPK-7829 Bumerang
 Kurganets-25
 Lazar 3
 Scorpion IFV (2A72)
 Toros
 Tusan IFV
 ZBD-86A (2A72)
 ZSL-92B (2A72)
 ZBD-03 (2A72)
 ZBD-04 (2A72)
 ZBD-05 (2A72)
 ZBL-08 (2A72)

 MRAPs
 K-4386 Typhoon-VDV

 Unmanned ground vehicles
 Bars BRShM (2A72)
 Uran-9 (2A72)
 UDAR UGV
 Vikhr UGV (2A72)

Attack helicopters
 Mil Mi-28
 Kamov Ka-29TB
 Kamov Ka-50
 Kamov Ka-52

Similar 30mm autocannons
The 2A72 30mm autocannon, designed by KBP Instrument Design Bureau, is a lighter, less complex cousin of the 2A42, with a longer barrel. While the latter has 578 parts, 2A72 has only 349 parts, allowing it to weigh only 84 kg (with 36 kg barrel). 2A72 use long recoil principle, resulted in lower recoil (7t instead of 20), but lower rate of fire (300-330 instead of 550). 2A72 is used in:
 ABM-M30M3 – remote Weapon Station made by Impulse-2, for Uran-9 or different armored vehicles.
 ABM-M30M3 Vikhr – another remote weapon station made by Impulse-2.
 TRT-30 – remote weapon station.

The 2A38 and 2A38M are 30mm twin-barrel autocannons, Gast-type. They are mainly used on air defense vehicles like 2K22 Tunguska and Pantsir-S1. It weighs 195 kg and has a maximum rate of fire of 2500 rd/min.

The Ordnance Factory Medak in India has developed the Medak gun and CRN 91 Naval Gun out of this platform.

Users
Current Operators
 
 
 
 
 
 
 
 
 
Former Operators

See also
 List of Russian weaponry
 2A42 Cobra
 2A46
 M242 Bushmaster 25mm chain gun
 Mk44 Bushmaster II
Bushmaster III
Bushmaster IV
 M230 chain gun
Medak gun

References
Notes

Bibliography

External links

 2A42 automatic cannon on KBP's official website
 2A42 automatic cannon on Tulamashzavod's official website

Artillery of Russia
30 mm artillery
Autocannons of the Soviet Union
Vehicle weapons
Cold War weapons of the Soviet Union
KBP Instrument Design Bureau products
Tulamashzavod products
Military equipment introduced in the 1980s